Sabaton is a Swedish heavy metal band from Falun, Sweden. The vast majority of their albums are written about historical events, mainly wars and significant battles. Sabaton has been referred to as one of the "big four" power metal bands, along with Helloween, Blind Guardian and DragonForce. They are one of the most successful metal bands in Swedish history.

History

Formation and first albums (1999–2009)
Sabaton was formed in December 1999. After the first songs were recorded in Peter Tägtgren's studio, The Abyss, Sabaton was contacted by a couple of record labels. The band signed with the Italian label Underground Symphony, which then released, internationally, the promo CD Fist for Fight. The disc, distilled from two demo tapes recorded between 1999 and 2000, was intended to promote forthcoming Sabaton releases. In 2002, a new album, Metalizer was recorded and was supposed to be distributed by Underground Symphony as the band's debut album. After two years of waiting, during which the band held various performances across Sweden, the album was abandoned.

Sabaton signed a new deal with Black Lodge, the metal division of the Sound Pollution record label, and released their second album titled Primo Victoria in 2005. Brodén stated that the album's title track "kicked off" the band's historical theme. Sundström stated that the band decided to focus primarily on historical themes in their lyrics after he and Brodén watched the film Saving Private Ryan.  In early 2005, keyboardist Daniel Myhr was recruited in order to relieve Joakim Brodén of his keyboard duties. In early 2006, Sabaton toured in support of Edguy and DragonForce. The band's third album, Attero Dominatus, was released in Europe on 28 July 2006. In March 2007, Sabaton released Metalizer as a double disc together with Fist for Fight, along with the previously unreleased song "Birds of War".

As a follow-up to Metalizer, in May 2008, Sabaton released its fourth album The Art of War, an album inspired by the influential book by Sun Tzu. The decision to base the album upon Sun Tzu's book came from the idea that in the 2000 years since the book was written, the human race has achieved many things, but, apart from weapon advancements, operational art, and strategy, war itself has remained basically the same. The album contains the singles "Cliffs of Gallipoli" and "Ghost Division". They toured Europe in 2009 as an opening act on the HammerFall Tour. After their Bloodstock performance, the band again went on tour with DragonForce, towards the end of 2009, for eighteen shows in the UK.

Coat of Arms (2010–2011)
The band had hoped to begin recording the next album in October, but with concerts booked and the DragonForce support tour the following month, it was pushed back. On 23 December 2009, the band announced the name of their forthcoming album. Coat of Arms contains a majority of songs about World War II including the Winter War. They announced it on their official website, and posted a link to a YouTube video containing the album art and a teaser music sample. Coat of Arms was released on 21 May 2010. The first music video, for "Uprising", was released on 1 August 2010 and features Peter Stormare. This was accompanied by a European tour. A second music video, for "Screaming Eagles", was released on 25 May.

Lineup change (2012–2015)
In 2012, two-thirds of Sabaton's lineup left the band. On 31 March vocalist Joakim Brodén confirmed rumors that the band would be going separate ways, with only Brodén himself and bass player Pär Sundström staying on board. Sabaton was joined by new members Chris Rörland and Thobbe Englund on guitar, and Robban Bäck on drums. Former Sabaton guitarists Oskar Montelius and Rikard Sundén, drummer Daniel Mullback and keyboardist Daniel Myhr went on, together with vocalist Nils Patrik Johansson and bassist Stefan Eriksson, to form a new band, Civil War. In November 2012, drummer Robban Bäck decided to take a break from touring due to becoming a father. Snowy Shaw replaced him as touring drummer, who in turn was replaced by Hannes Van Dahl in November 2013. Prior to replacing Shaw, Van Dahl had worked as Shaw's drum technician while drumming for the band Evergrey.

In the same year, Sabaton released a new concept album Carolus Rex.

In January 2014, the band announced the cover of their new album called Heroes, then due to be released on 16 May 2014. The album proved to be a hit and made #1 on the official Swedish album chart. On 27 January the band was announced to play Download Festival in June. In October 2015 performed their first concert in Japan in Loud Park.

The Last Stand (2016–2018)
In December 2015, five songs by the band were added to the third external music pack for the strategy game Europa Universalis IV by Paradox Interactive.

On 6 June 2016, the 72nd anniversary of D-Day, they released a music pack for the Paradox game Hearts of Iron IV with songs based on World War II, the theme of the game. They released a second on 26 January 2017.

Their eighth album The Last Stand, was released on 19 August 2016, announced in April. On 10 June 2016 the first single of the album was released, called "The Lost Battalion" which is about the eponymous military unit of World War I. On 25 July 2016, the band announced that guitarist Thobbe Englund had left the band. Thobbe Englund played his last show with Sabaton at Sabaton Open Air 2016.

Tommy Johansson of Majestica was announced immediately as the new member after Englund's final show with the band.

Pär Sundström stated in a 2017 interview that the group would be touring less in 2018 so they could concentrate on writing and recording their next album. Joakim Brodén confirmed a 2019 release date for the still-untitled album in a September 2018 interview on MAD TV's show TV War. On 31 December 2018, it was further confirmed in an official announcement YouTube video.

Sabaton History and The Great War (2019)
On 8 January 2019, the band announced the creation of a YouTube channel called Sabaton History, a cooperation between Indy Neidell, TimeGhost History and Sabaton. The channel documents the history of the events behind Sabaton songs and the songs themselves. The channel was created on 7 February 2019.

On 22 April 2019 Sabaton released a standalone single, "Bismarck", in a collaboration with Wargaming and their game World of Warships. The song is about the German Battleship , one of the biggest ever built in Europe. Commissioned in August 1940, it sank in May 1941 after an intense hunt in the North Atlantic.

On 2 April 2019, the band announced a new concept album about the First World War entitled The Great War. On 5 May 2019, they played in Plzeň on the anniversary of the Prague uprising. The album was released on 19 July 2019. The first single on the album 'Fields of Verdun', was released on 3 May. On 13 June the lyric video for the song, "Red Baron", was released. On 27 June the premiere of "The Great War" was released.

On 1 August 2019, the band performed their 20th anniversary show at Wacken Open Air festival 2019; during the gig former guitarist Thobbe Englund joined the band on stage for two songs. In the second half of the show Sabaton invited other former members to the festival's second stage - Rikard Sundén, Daniel Mÿhr, and Daniel Mullback, along with Englund. Sundén, Mÿhr, and Mullback are all members of Civil War, a similar band formed by the three along with Oskar Montelius, another former Sabaton member, as well as Nils Patrik Johansson and Stefan Erikkson, neither of whom are former Sabaton members.

On 30 August 2019, the band was involved in a serious car accident in Tunisia while returning from a music video shoot in the Sahara Desert. Injuries from the wreck forced them to cancel a show in Gdańsk, Poland.

Single releases and The War to End All Wars (2020–present)
On 23 December 2020, Sabaton posted a short teaser of a new song on YouTube, writing: "We bet you did not see this one coming.. Are you ready for some new Sabaton music? Wait no more! Hear now a teaser of one of our upcoming songs.." On the next day, the band announced that they would begin recording their tenth studio album "in a few days".

They released "Livgardet", the Swedish version of a new single, on 26 February 2021, with the English version released on 9 April. The song is a tribute to the Swedish regiment Livgardet, the Royal Guard, released in relation to its 500-year anniversary as a military unit, making it one of the world's longest serving military units. The song was initially done in cooperation with the Swedish Armed Forces and Livgardet regiment, but the cooperation was halted after orders from the Swedish Army Command, citing the fact that Sabaton had played on Crimea in 2015 on a festival hosted by the Russian motorcycle gang Night Wolves.

On 7 May 2021, a single called "Defence of Moscow", an English cover of a song in Russian by Radio Tapok, was released.

On 10 August 2021, Sabaton posted a teaser for 14 August 2021 in morse code translating to 'The war to end all wars.' This then lead to the announcement on 14 August 2021 of their new album continuing on the subject of World War I with the title The War to End All Wars. It was released on 4 March 2022. The first single from the album, "Christmas Truce", was released on 29 October 2021. The second single from the album, "Soldier of Heaven", was released on 7 January 2022. The third single from the album, "The Unkillable Soldier", was released on 11 February 2022.

On 25 August 2021, the song "Steel Commanders" was released in support of new Sabaton content in the popular video game World of Tanks. It was later elected by Loudwire as the 33rd best metal song of 2021.

On 30 September 2022, the song "Father" about German scientist Fritz Haber was released as the first single from their EP Weapons of the Modern Age, part of a planned three-part trilogy titled Echoes of the Great War.  Another single titled "The First Soldier" was released 20 January 2023, with the EP titled "Heroes of the Great War".

Lyrical and musical style

The band's main lyrical themes are based on war, historical battles, and acts of heroism, influenced by bands such as Iron Maiden. Their name is a reference to a sabaton, knight's foot armor. The armor and battle theme is heard in most songs in almost every album except Metalizer. In their albums, The Great War and The War To End All Wars, which were released on 19 July 2019 and 4 March 2022, all the songs were based on World War I. Lyrical content drawn from World War I, World War II and other historical conflicts is prevalent and lyrics often recite stories of heroic deeds by men, women, and armies, such as the song "White Death", which was made in honor of legendary Finnish sniper Simo Häyhä. This song and other Sabaton lyrics have been criticized by Swedish historian Mikael Nilsson for avoiding the topic of Soviet communism and Soviet war crimes and sometimes glorifying the Soviet Union. 

The band's supposed pro-Soviet stance is reinforced by the facts that they performed at a show organized by Putin loyalist motorcycle club Night Wolves in Russian occupied Crimea in 2015, and that bassist Sundström in an interview with Sweden Rock Magazine 2016 stated that Crimea had previously been occupied by Ukraine. In 2022, Sabaton did nonetheless receive the Public Educator Award from the Swedish Skeptics Association, after investigation by the Swedish Skeptics Association on these statements. 

Sabaton is often referred to as a power metal band by both music critics and the general public, deemed "a major force in the power metal field since the mid-2000s." However, the band has traditionally rejected the term and they consider themselves a unique form of heavy metal. Bassist Pär Sundström said in an interview: "I don't think Sabaton can only be categorized as power metal, as the two main attributes of power metal are high pitched vocals and fantasy lyrics and Sabaton have neither of those. We simply play our version of heavy metal—what heavy metal is to us. I'm sure that has impacted our reach, in addition to the fact that we don't give up after only a few tries! That, and Sabaton's music appeals to people of all ages." Joakim Brodèn has also made similar statements regarding the difference between Sabaton's low vocals and the high vocals of traditional power metal.

Members

Current
Joakim Brodén – lead vocals, additional guitars (1999–present), keyboards (1999–2005, 2012–present)
Pär Sundström – bass (1999–present), backing vocals (2012–present)
Chris Rörland – guitars, backing vocals (2012–present)
Hannes Van Dahl – drums, backing vocals (2014–present)
Tommy Johansson – guitars, backing vocals (2016—present)

Former
Richard Larsson – drums (1999–2001)
Oskar Montelius – guitars, backing vocals (1999–2012)
Rikard Sundén – guitars, backing vocals (1999–2012)
Daniel Mullback – drums, backing vocals (2001–2012)
Daniel Mÿhr – keyboards, backing vocals (2005–2012)
Robban Bäck – drums (2012–2013)
Thobbe Englund – guitars, backing vocals (2012–2016)

Former touring musicians
Frédéric Leclercq – rhythm guitar (2011; replaced Sundén due to his paternity leave)
Snowy Shaw – drums (2012–2013; replaced Bäck due to his paternity leave)
Daniel Sjögren – drums (2017; replaced Van Dahl due to his paternity leave)

Recording timeline

Timeline

Discography

Primo Victoria (2005)
Attero Dominatus (2006)
Metalizer (2007)
The Art of War (2008)
Coat of Arms (2010)
Carolus Rex (2012)
Heroes (2014)
The Last Stand (2016)
The Great War (2019)
The War to End All Wars (2022)

Awards

|-
| 2011 || Sabaton || Best Breakthrough Band || 
|-
| 2012 || Sabaton || Metal As Fuck || 
|-
| 2013 || Sabaton || Best Live Band || 
|-
| 2018 || Sabaton || Best Live Band || 

|-
| 2012 || Sabaton || Best Live Band || 

|-
| 2012 || Sabaton || Best Swedish Group || 
|-
| 2012 || Sabaton || Best Swedish Live Act || 
|-
| 2013 || Carolus Rex || Best Swedish Album || 
|-
| 2013 || Sabaton || Best Swedish Live Act || 
|-
| 2013 || Sabaton || Best Swedish Group / Artist || 

|-
| 2013 || Sabaton || The Year's hard rock/metal || 

In 2008, the then presiding archbishop of Gdansk Sławoj Leszek Głódź awarded Sabaton with an authentic Polish officer sabre, the background was that the band had highlighted Polish soldiers in some of their songs.

References

External links

 Youtube channel
 
 
 Sabaton's record label 

1999 establishments in Sweden
Artists from Dalarna
Musical groups established in 1999
Musical quintets
Nuclear Blast artists
Swedish power metal musical groups
Power metal musical groups